Brady Williamson (born December 29, 1976) is an American politician who has served in the Mississippi House of Representatives from the 10th district since 2020.

References

1976 births
Living people
Republican Party members of the Mississippi House of Representatives